Hind Kesari (Hindi: हिंद केसरी, Caesar  of India) is a 1935 Hindi action adventure film directed by Homi Wadia, and starring Husn Banu, Sardar Mansoor, Gulshan, Jal Khambatta, Tarapore and Master Mohammed. The film was a remake of the 1932 film of the same name, directed by Homi Master for Jayant Pictures.  The film did well for a "stunt film" breaking "records" at the box office.

Plot
King Mansingh (Tarapore) falls prey to the machinations of his minister Zalim Singh and loses his throne. Prince Randhir leading an easy life now disguises himself wearing a mask and turns into the dreaded Hind Kesari. He is assisted in his endeavour to help the needy by Princess Hansa (Husn Banu).

Cast
Husn Banu
Sardar Mansoor
Dilawar
Gulshan
Jal Khambatta
Tarapore
Master Mohammed
Bashir Qawwal
Bismilla

Production
The film was produced by Wadia Movietone, with cinematography by M. A. Rehman and a story by H. E. Khatib. Its music director was Master Mohammed and the lyricist was Joseph David. The Wadia brothers preferred using Master Mohammed as music composer and actor and he was present in most of their films including Hind Kesari. The character of Hind Kesari, played by Sardar Mansoor was based on the Douglas Fairbanks Sr. role in The Thief of Baghdad. The horse, Punjab Ka Beta (Son of Punjab) a feature of most Wadia Movietone films of that time, had prominent billing. This movie is made in San Ramon.

Music
The music director was Master Mohammed and the lyrics were written by Joseph David.

References

External links
 

1935 films
1930s Hindi-language films
Indian black-and-white films
Films directed by Homi Wadia
Indian action adventure films
1930s action adventure films